John Henry Lewis (July 21, 1830 – January 6, 1929) was a U.S. Representative from Illinois.

Born near Ithaca, New York, Lewis moved to Illinois in 1836 with his parents, who settled on a farm in Fulton County, near Ellisville.
He attended the rural schools.
He moved to Knox County, Illinois, in 1847 and engaged in agricultural pursuits near Knoxville.
He studied law.
He was admitted to the bar in 1860 and commenced practice in Knoxville, Illinois.
He served as clerk of the circuit court of Knox County 1860–1864.
He served as member of the State house of representatives in 1874 and 1875.

Lewis was elected as a Republican to the Forty-seventh Congress (March 4, 1881 – March 3, 1883).
He was an unsuccessful candidate for reelection in 1882 to the Forty-eighth Congress.
He resumed the practice of law before retiring in 1900.
He died in Knoxville, Illinois, on January 6, 1929, at the age of 98.
He was interred in Knoxville Cemetery.

References

1830 births
1929 deaths
Politicians from Ithaca, New York
People from Knoxville, Illinois
Republican Party members of the Illinois House of Representatives
Republican Party members of the United States House of Representatives from Illinois